Bedroom is a 2012 Indian Bengali drama film directed by Mainak Bhaumik. Bedroom starring Abir Chatterjee, Rudranil Ghosh, Ushasie, Parno Mitra, Paoli Dam, Rahul, Tanushree, Anubroto Basu & others.

Synopsis 
Joy, Ananda, and Deb are three friends. Ananda, an I.T. engineer who hails from a middle-class family, is married off to a rich Bengali girl, Priyanka. Priyanka's friend, Ritika maintains a live-in relationship with Joy. On the other hand, Deb is a somewhat successful actor who despises love, relationship, and the idea of marriage, rather wills to fooling around with whoever catches his eyes.

Ananda, despite his determination and honesty, struggles to sustain his work-life balance, thus putting off Priyanka. Joy conducts an acting workshop but cannot land himself in a proper role, leaving Ritika the only source of income of the household. Ritika, a fashion photographer, herself remains devastated not only due to Joy's constant frustration and insecurities but also to her family's pressure to get married as soon as possible.

Joy is met with Tanisha, a prostitute who attends Joy's acting classes. Through conversations, and constant meetings after classes, they get comfortable with each other, particularly Tanisha as Joy starts to be more open in her presence. Gradually Tanisha expresses her desire to be saved by a man who would accept her past and make her his one and only, by buying her a red shoe from a specific shoe store that she has eyes upon since her arrival in the city. 

Ritika also starts a casual fling with a younger university student, who is seemed to have fallen for her. Meanwhile, Ananda is fired by his company, as he refuses to do a nasty favor in exchange for his promotion. Fearing that his wife might leave him, Ananda continues to leave early as regular in the morning, only to roam around the city till dark. This is eventually discovered by Priyanka and Ritika but they keep that a secret from him.

A reporter named Ipshita Chowdhury starts to take an interview with Deb for her Newspaper article. During the interview, the two find out that they have a lot in common in their life as both don't believe in love, relationship, and marriage, due to having similar heartbreaks and trust issues induced by their former lovers. Eventually, they engage physically. But due to their own fear of being rejected by the other, they call it a night and gradually depart from each other's lives, causing distress and regret within themselves.

Priyanka is met with a school friend Rajat who has returned from the USA for a time being to get married. Ananda, being known to the fact that Rajat was an ex boyfriend of Priyanka in her teenage years, wants to get in between but resists himself in fear of getting found out. So he rather enters home late night, being drunk. Meanwhile Joy becomes fed up with Ritika and decides to sabotage the relationship through bringing Tanisha in his life. He tells Tanisha to stay in front of the shoe store, signaling that he is ready to accept her in his life. Such action is discovered by Deb and he warns Joy to cut off Tanisha immediately because he cannot risk his friend of being in severe financial crisis. Despite refusing Deb, Joy gives in and disconnects Tanisha from his life by leaving her alone in front of the store. Tanisha realizes the irony, buys the shoe herself and returns home. In the same time, Ritika dumps the student after a brief period.

One day, Ananda returns home early and finds that Priyanka is not home. He sees her phone on the table and casually checks through her inbox. He gets irritated of Priyanka and Rajat's texts and suspects his wife of infidelity. After an hour or so, upon his wife's arrival, he confronts her about the texts, only to realize that she intentionally left her phone for Ananda to go through the texts. She also informs him that Rajat had actually lied about getting married, rather he only met Priyanka to get back with her. But Priyanka instantly rejected his advances for definite reasons. She also opens up about Ananda not being truthful to her. She tells him that she has always loved him due to his honesty, determination and his urge to prove his self-worth. Realizing his mistakes, he shames himself and seeks forgiveness from her. Priyanka, in exchange for her mercy, becomes the torchbearer in Ananda's life.

Ananda finally provides the favor his former boss had asked for. He calls for an escort to comfort his boss, who is none other than Tanisha herself.

2 months later, Ananda gets his old job back with an instant promotion. Ritika finally gets married to Joy, much to Joy's severe discomfort but nonetheless he seems to have been got over it. Deb, on the other hand, decides to remain unmarried for the rest of his life. Priyanka tells Ritika that she is pregnant.

The movie closes with Tanisha being hanged from the ceiling fan, wearing the red shoes she had bought 2 months earlier.

Cast
 Abir Chatterjee as Ananda
 Rudranil Ghosh as Deb
 Ushashie Chakraborty as Ipshita
 Parno Mittra as Ritika
 Paoli Dam as Priyanka
 Rahul Banerjee as Joy
 Vikram Chatterjee as Rajat
 Tanushree Chakraborty as Tanisha
 Biswanath Basu as Deb's assistant
 Pallavi Chatterjee as Ipshita's Colleague

Music
Rupam Islam and Allan Ao, two members from the Bengali rock band Fossils, wrote the soundtrack for Bedroom.

Soundtrack

References

External links
 

2012 films
Films set in Kolkata
Bengali-language Indian films
2010s Bengali-language films
Films directed by Mainak Bhaumik